Isabella Dinsmore Greenway (née Selmes; born March 22, 1886 – December 18, 1953) was an American politician who was the first congresswoman in Arizona history, and as the founder of the Arizona Inn of Tucson. During her life she was also noted as a one-time owner and operator of Los Angeles-based Gilpin Airlines, a speaker at the 1932 Democratic National Convention, and a bridesmaid at the wedding of Eleanor and Franklin D. Roosevelt.

Early life
Isabella Dinsmore Selmes was born the daughter of Tilden Russell Selmes (1835–1895) and Martha "Patty" Macomb Flandrau  (1861–1923).  Isabella was born  at the historic Dinsmore Farm in Boone County, Kentucky which was owned by her mother's maternal great aunt Julia Stockton Dinsmore (1833–1926). Tilden Selmes was general counsel for the Northern Pacific Railroad.  Patty Flandrau was the daughter of Minnesota judge and politician Charles Eugene Flandrau (1828–1903) and his first wife Isabella Ramsay Dinsmore (1830–1867).

The Selmes family owned a ranch in the Dakota Territory that was close to Theodore Roosevelt's ranch and they developed a close friendship with each other.  After the untimely death of her father in 1895, Isabella and her mother lived with various members of her mother's family in Kentucky, Minnesota, and New York.  Isabella attended Miss Chapin's School in New York City, where she met and became lifelong friends with Roosevelt's niece, Eleanor.

First and second marriages
In 1905, Isabella was one of Eleanor's bridesmaids when Eleanor Roosevelt married Franklin Delano Roosevelt.  Shortly thereafter, while the Roosevelts were on their honeymoon, Isabella married Robert Munro-Ferguson (1867–1922), the younger brother of Ronald Munro-Furguson (1860–1934).  Robert was a family friend of the Roosevelts, as well as one of Theodore Roosevelt's Rough Riders.  Robert and Isabella became the godparents of Franklin and Eleanor's only daughter, Anna Eleanor Roosevelt.

Three years into the marriage, Robert contracted tuberculosis and in 1910 the couple moved to the dry climate of New Mexico, hoping his health would improve. There Isabella nursed her husband and educated their two children; Robert, Jr. (1908)  and Martha (1906).
During this period, Isabella and Eleanor established a close correspondence that continued for the rest of their lives.

After Robert's death in 1922, Isabella married a close friend, Gen. John Campbell Greenway (1872–1926), another of Roosevelt's Rough Riders, whom she had met in 1911. John moved the family to a ranch in Arizona near Bisbee where he was manager of the Calumet and Arizona Mining Company. Later the family moved to Ajo where Isabella and John's son, John Selmes ("Jack") Greenway (1924–1995) was born. In 1926, John died suddenly, following surgery, leaving Isabella a widow once again.

Isabella and her two children moved to Williams, Arizona, and bought the Quarter Circle Double X Ranch as she and John had planned. During the same period, she also became the owner and operator of Los Angeles-based Gilpin Airlines.

Activism and politics

Isabella's political interests and social activism paralleled the interests of her friend Eleanor.  During the First World War she developed and directed a network of southwest women who farmed while the men were overseas. During the late 1920s she opened  Arizona Hut, a furniture factory employing disabled veterans and their immediate families.  In 1928 she became Arizona's Democratic national committeewoman, and in 1932 she campaigned heavily for Franklin Roosevelt.  She made one of the speeches seconding his nomination at the 1932 Democratic National Convention.

Greenway was elected as Arizona's sole Representative to the 73rd Congress in 1932 to complete the unexpired term of resigning Rep. Lewis W. Douglas, who had been appointed the U.S director of the budget.  She won reelection in 1934.  On her fiftieth birthday she announced that she was retiring from public office.  There was some expectation that had she run in the 1936 election, she would have been unopposed in both the primary and general elections. Though she broadly supported New Deal legislation during her terms in Congress, she demonstrated her political independence by breaking with the President over some issues of concern to veterans, an important part of her political base in Arizona.  She opposed legislation to reduce the pensions of World War I servicemen, funds for which FDR planned to shift to fund economic recovery programs.  She also opposed some provisions of the Social Security Act, which she believed would be impossible to implement in the long term.

Later life

In 1939 she married mining executive Harry O. King (1890–1976), a former National Recovery Administration manager for the copper industry, and then-president of the  Institute of Applied Economics in New York City. During this marriage, Isabella spent part of her time in New York City and part in Tucson.

She died in 1953 in Tucson at the Arizona Inn, which she had founded in 1930.  She is buried on the Dinsmore Homestead in Kentucky where she had been born.

In Phoenix, Greenway Road and several public schools are named for her second husband, John Campbell Greenway.

See also
 Women in the United States House of Representatives

References

Other sources
 "Isabella Selmes Greenway" in Women in Congress, 1917–1990. Prepared under the direction of the Commission on the Bicentenary by the Office of the Historian, U.S. House of Representatives. Washington: Government Printing Office, 1991.
 "Isabella Greenway King" in the magazine series Arizona Pioneers, in Copper State Journal, Fall 1997.  Compiled and edited by Floyd R. Negley.
 Beasley, Maurine H. et al., The Eleanor Roosevelt Encyclopedia, pp. 217–218
 
 

Female members of the United States House of Representatives
1886 births
1953 deaths
Lauder Greenway Family
Women in Arizona politics
Democratic Party members of the United States House of Representatives from Arizona
20th-century American politicians
20th-century American women politicians
People from Boone County, Kentucky
People from Bisbee, Arizona
People from Pima County, Arizona
People from Williams, Arizona